Georges "Jo" Querelle is the protagonist and antihero of Jean Genet's 1947 novel Querelle de Brest.

Character overview
A sailor on the cargo ship Le Vengeur, Querelle is also a thief, prostitute, opium smuggler, and serial killer. While he ostensibly kills for money, his primary motive for murder is the sheer, liberating pleasure he experiences from it; he kills to feel alive.

Sexuality
While most of Querelle's sexual partners are men, he is more aroused by power than by people. Genet writes that Querelle views sex as an act of either domination or submission, and so treats his partners as objects that exist for the sole purpose of enacting his sadomasochistic fantasies of power and punishment. He has at least a passing interest in women; in one of the novel's main conflicts, he competes with his brother Robert for Madame Lysiane, Robert's mistress and the proprietess of a brothel they both visit. Even then, however, Querelle's pursuit of her is completely self-serving, a ploy to get the best of his brother.

His mysterious, brooding persona and sexual ambiguity make him an object of fascination and attraction to everyone in his orbit, especially Madame Lysiane and Lieutenant Seblon, his closeted superior officer. While not completely understanding who or what he is, the people in his life find themselves inescapably drawn to him, often at their own peril.

In the novel
He runs his smuggling racket out of Le Vengeur, enlisting Vic, one of his shipmates, as his accomplice. One night, when the ship is docked in the French port town of Brest, Querelle slits Vic's throat. The ship is delayed at the port as the police investigate, led by Mario, a predatory police captain who extorts sexual favors from the men he investigates before putting them in jail.

Desperate for a scapegoat, Querelle befriends Gilbert "Gil" Turko, a young man fleeing arrest for the murder of a man who propositioned him, with the intention of framing him for Vic's murder. Much to his surprise, however, he finds in Gil a kindred spirit whom he wants to "teach," both in sex and in the "art" of murder. He enlists Gil to help in mugging Seblon, confident that the lieutenant's infatuation with him will prevent him from going to the police.

Querelle sleeps with Mario in an attempt to get him to back away from arresting him or Gil, but the captain is unmoved from turning him into yet another of his jailed conquests. Seeing no alternative, Querelle betrays Gil to Mario, adding to Gil's already dire situation the blame for a murder he didn't commit.

At the end of the novel, Querelle seduces Seblon, only to turn him over to the police the next day. He leaves Brest the same day when Le Vengeur sets sail.

Portrayals in other media
Querelle was portrayed by Brad Davis in Rainer Werner Fassbinder's 1982 film adaptation of the novel.

References

Fictional bisexual males
Fictional male prostitutes
Fictional sailors
Fictional serial killers
Literary characters introduced in 1947
Characters in French novels of the 20th century
Fictional LGBT characters in film
Crime film characters
Fictional smugglers
Fictional LGBT characters in literature